Private Selby is a 1912 thriller novel by the British writer Edgar Wallace. It was one of a number of books and plays written before the First World War about the dangers of a future German invasion of Britain. The hero Dick Selby had first appeared in a serial in the Sunday Journal in 1909 and was modelled on Wallace himself.

References

1912 British novels
Novels by Edgar Wallace
British thriller novels